The Makira fantail  or dusky fantail (Rhipidura tenebrosa) is a species of bird in the family Rhipiduridae.
It is endemic to the Solomon Islands.

Its natural habitat is subtropical or tropical moist lowland forests.
It is threatened by habitat loss.

Taxonomy 

Makira fantail (R. tenebrosa) forms a superspecies with: 
 Brown fantail (R. drownei)
 Rennell fantail (R. rennelliana)
 Streaked fantail (R. verreauxi)
 Kadavu fantail (R. personata)
 Samoan fantail (R. nebulosa)

References

Makira fantail
Birds of Makira
Makira fantail
Taxonomy articles created by Polbot